Jim Crowley is a flat jockey riding in Great Britain and was British flat racing Champion Jockey in 2016.

History 
Jim Crowley (Born 14 July 1978) comes from Ascot and after beginning his horse racing career as an amateur flat race jockey he switched to National Hunt racing, riding for the stable of Sue Smith. He rode approximately 300 winners in National Hunt racing before returning to Flat racing and riding for his sister-in-law, Amanda Perrett, at Pulborough. In 2010 he became stable jockey for Ralph Beckett. Crowley won his first British champion jockeys' title in 2016, beating the 2015 champion, Silvestre de Sousa, into second place and breaking the record for most winners ridden in a month with 46 victories in September.

In November 2016 Jim Crowley was announced as the new number one jockey to leading owner Hamdan al-Maktoum

Major wins 
 Great Britain
 British Champion Fillies & Mares Stakes - (2) - Madame Chiang (2014), Eshaada (2021)
 Commonwealth Cup - (1) - Eqtidaar (2018)
 Coronation Cup - (1)  Hukum (2022) 
 Eclipse Stakes - (1) - Ulysses (2017)
 Falmouth Stakes - (1) - Nazeef (2020)
 Haydock Sprint Cup - (1) -  Minzaal (2022) 
 International Stakes - (2) - Ulysses (2017), Baaeed (2022)
 King's Stand Stakes - (2) - Prohibit (2011), Battaash (2020)
 Lockinge Stakes - (1) -  Baaeed (2022) 
 Nunthorpe Stakes - (2) - Battaash (2019, 2020)
 Queen Anne Stakes - (1) -  Baaeed (2022) 
 Queen Elizabeth II Stakes - (1) - Baaeed (2021)
 Sun Chariot Stakes - (1)  Nazeef (2020) 
 Sussex Stakes - (3) - Here Comes When (2017), Mohaather (2020), Baaeed (2022)

 France
 Prix de l'Abbaye de Longchamp - (1) - Battaash (2017)
 Prix Jean Prat - (1) - Lord Shanakill (2009)
 Prix du Moulin de Longchamp - (1) - Baaeed (2021)

 Italy
 Gran Premio Merano - (1) - Masini (2004)

References 

Living people
British jockeys
British Champion flat jockeys
Year of birth missing (living people)
Lester Award winners